Wenxing, may refer to:

 Wenxing, Yilong County, a town in Yilong County, Sichuan, China
 Wenxing, Dazhu County, a town in Dazhu County, Sichuan, China
 Wenxing Subdistrict, a subdistrict in Xiangyin County, Hunan, China